Levonte Johnson is a Canadian professional soccer player who plays for Whitecaps FC 2 in the MLS Next Pro. He played college soccer for Syracuse University.

Playing career
He attended David Suzuki Secondary School in Brampton, Ontario, Canada.

College
During his freshman year in 2019, Johnson played for Eastern Florida State College and led them to their first National Junior College Athletic Association championship game. After the cancellation of the 2020 season due to COVID-19, he moved to Salt Lake Community College where he guided the Bruins to their inaugural NJCAA title. He moved to Seattle University, where he only remained for a brief period of a couple of months despite leading the team in goals and assists and winning the Western Athletic Conference.

In January 2022, Johnson transferred to Syracuse and began playing with starting forward Nathan Opoku, who would later be drafted by the Leicester City F.C. of the Premier League. At the end of the 2022 season, he was named a first-team All-American and won national championship.

Semi-pro clubs
In 2016 and 2017, he played for the Master's FA team of the League1 Ontario.

In 2019, he played for the Treasure Coast Tritons in USL League Two.

Johnson played for Portland Timbers U23 in USL League Two in 2021, tallying a goal in seven appearances.

In 2022, he played for Chicago FC United.

Vancouver Whitecaps FC 
He was selected by the Vancouver Whitecaps FC as the 29th overall pick in the 2023 MLS SuperDraft.

Career statistics

Honours
Syracuse University

 Atlantic Division regular season: 2022
 ACC men's soccer tournament: 2022
 NCAA Division I men's soccer tournament: 2022

Individual
 Missouri Athletic Club Hermann Trophy Finalist: 2022
 NCAA All-Tournament Team: 2022
 All-ACC First Team: 2022
 NCAA First Team All-America: 2022
 United Soccer Coaches' All-South Region First Team

References

External links
 Syracuse bio

1999 births
Living people
Soccer players from Brampton
Canadian soccer players
All-American men's college soccer players
Association football forwards
EFSC Titans men's soccer players
League1 Ontario players
Portland Timbers U23s players
Salt Lake Community College alumni
Seattle Redhawks men's soccer players
Syracuse Orange men's soccer players
USL League Two players
Vancouver Whitecaps FC draft picks
Whitecaps FC 2 players